Carmenta mariona is a moth of the family Sesiidae. It was described by William Beutenmüller in 1900. It is found in the United States from Montana, south to Arizona and east to Kansas.

Adults are on wing from June to August.

The larvae feed on the roots of Amsinckia species and Lithospermum incisum.

References

External links
mothphotographersgroup

Sesiidae
Moths described in 1900